Cathedral City, colloquially known as "Cat City", is a desert resort city in Riverside County, California, United States, within the Colorado Desert's Coachella Valley. Situated between Palm Springs and Rancho Mirage, the city has the second largest population, after Indio, of the nine cities in the Coachella Valley. Its population was 51,493 at the 2020 census, a slight increase from 51,200 at the 2010 census.

Prior to the arrival of European explorers and settlers, the land was part of the territory inhabited by the Cahuilla Indians. Today every other square mile of the city is part of the Agua Caliente Band of Cahuilla Indians reservation land. Development of a town began when a housing subdivision was built in 1925, although it was not incorporated until 1981.

History

Etymology

The city's name is derived from Cathedral Canyon located to the south of the city in the foothills of the Santa Rosa and San Jacinto Mountains National Monument. The canyon is said to have received its name because certain rock formations in the canyon were reminiscent of a cathedral. A flood in August 1946 significantly altered the cathedral-like features of the canyon.

In the United Kingdom a cathedral city is a town that has achieved "city" status and is typically the location of a cathedral. This prompted Robert Ripley to include the town of Cathedral City in his December 9, 1939, Believe It Or Not column stating, "Believe it or not … there is no church in Cathedral City, Calif. It is named after a canyon".

Early history: before 1860
Cathedral City sits at the northwestern end of the Coachella Valley between the San Bernardino Mountains to the north, and the San Jacinto Mountains to the south, with the San Gorgonio Pass to the West.  The earliest established inhabitants of this region were the Cahuilla Indians. They arrived in the area around 3,000 BCE.  The Cahuilla were organized into bands of about 600 to 800 people, and it was the Agua Caliente Band of Cahuilla Indians who inhabited the lands that included what would become Cathedral City, California.

The land was claimed by Spain in 1768 when Spain established Las Californias, a province of the Viceroyalty of New Spain, and then by Mexico in 1821 when Mexico and Spain signed the Treaty of Cordoba. At that time the province had already been renamed and expanded into the larger Alta California province. After the Mexican–American War, and with the signing of the Treaty of Guadalupe Hidalgo in 1848, possession of the land was formally transferred to the United States, and it officially became part of the State of California when the state was formed in 1850.
 
In 1852 US Army Colonel Henry Washington, a nephew of George Washington, the first President of the United States, was contracted by the government to survey Southern California.  On November 7 of that year he established the initial point, in the San Bernardino Mountains, from which all future surveys in Southern California would be based. In 1855 he was contracted to continue his work and survey the Coachella Valley.  It was then that he found and named Cathedral Canyon for which Cathedral City would be named.

Besides Colonel Henry Washington, there were occasional explorers, colonizers and soldiers that made their way through the area during the Spanish, Mexican, and early American eras, but none established any permanent structures or residences.  The Cahuilla remained the only people known to be living in the area.

Stage and freight lines 1860–1880
Prior to the 1860s the only regularly traveled routes through the Coachella Valley were trading paths used by the Cahuilla and other Native American tribes.  One of these paths, on the southwestern side of the valley, followed the base of the San Jacinto and Santa Rosa mountains somewhere near the Whitewater River, and would have passed through the area that would become Cathedral City.  Early non-native explorers, surveyors, and military, such as Colonel Washington, made use of these routes, but regular transportation services were not established until 1862.
  
The Colorado River Gold Rush, which started in the spring of 1862, prompted William D. Bradshaw, a frontiersman, to seek a quicker route from Los Angeles to the Colorado River.  Later that year he hired a guide, and with the help of the Cahuilla and Maricopa Indians, mapped a route from San Bernardino, California, through the San Gorgonio Pass and Coachella Valley, past the northern shore of the Salton Sink, through the passes between the Chuckwalla and Chocolate Mountains, and up to the Colorado River across from La Paz in the New Mexico Territory, (now the state of Arizona).  Much of the route is thought to have followed the original southwestern trading path used by the Cahuilla.

Shortly after Bradshaw defined the trail from San Bernardino to La Paz, various stagecoach and freight companies began using the route.  The stage and freight lines brought miners, supplies, and mail between San Bernardino and La Paz, and the route became known as the Bradshaw Trail or “Gold Road”.  The Bradshaw trail, like the original Cahuillian trail, passed through the future Cathedral City, but the nearest scheduled stops were Agua Caliente (now Palms Springs), and Indian Wells (now Indio). The stage and freight lines were eventually supplanted by the railroads, but the trail would later become the basis for Palm Canyon Drive and Highway 111 that run through the city today.

Depression era nightclubs
In 1931, Al and Lou Wertheimer of the reputed Detroit "Purple Gang" opened the Dunes Club just outside Palm Springs' city limits. This was followed in 1939 by Earl T. Sausser's 139 Club and the Cove Club in 1941, built by Jake Katelman and Frank Portnoy.

Cathedral City today

Cathedral City began a downtown revitalization program in the late 1990s, which was substantially completed by 2005.

Geography

Demographics

2010
The 2010 United States Census reported that Cathedral City had a population of 51,200. The racial makeup of Cathedral City was 32,537 (63.5%) White (32.3% Non-Hispanic White), 1,344 (2.6%) African American, 540 (1.1%) Native American, 2,562 (5.0%) Asian, 55 (0.1%) Pacific Islander, 12,008 (23.5%) from other races, and 2,154 (4.2%) from two or more races. Hispanic or Latino of any race were 30,085 persons (58.8%).

The Census reported that 50,905 people (99.4% of the population) lived in households, 263 (0.5%) lived in non-institutionalized group quarters, and 32 (0.1%) were institutionalized.

There were 17,047 households, out of which 6,574 (38.6%) had children under the age of 18 living in them, 7,589 (44.5%) were opposite-sex married couples living together, 2,291 (13.4%) had a female householder with no husband present, 1,176 (6.9%) had a male householder with no wife present. There were 1,054 (6.2%) unmarried opposite-sex partnerships, and 779 (4.6%) same-sex married couples or partnerships. 4,292 households (25.2%) were made up of individuals, and 2,259 (13.3%) had someone living alone who was 65 years of age or older. The average household size was 2.99. There were 11,056 families (64.9% of all households); the average family size was 3.67.

The population was spread out, with 13,856 people (27.1%) under the age of 18, 4,906 people (9.6%) aged 18 to 24, 12,948 people (25.3%) aged 25 to 44, 12,127 people (23.7%) aged 45 to 64, and 7,363 people (14.4%) who were 65 years of age or older. The median age was 36.0 years. For every 100 females, there were 105.9 males. For every 100 females age 18 and over, there were 107.2 males.

The homeowner vacancy rate was 4.2%; the rental vacancy rate was 11.0%. 30,236 people (59.1% of the population) lived in owner-occupied housing units and 20,669 people (40.4%) lived in rental housing units.

During 2009–2013, Cathedral City had a median household income of $44,406, with 20.5% of the population living below the federal poverty line.

2000

As of the census of 2000, there were 42,647 people, 14,027 households, and 9,622 families residing in the city. The racial makeup of the city was 65.3% White, about half (50%) of the population is Hispanic or Latino. 2.7% Black or African American, 1.0% Native American, 3.7% Asian, 0.1% Pacific Islander, 23.1% from other races, and 4.1% from two or more races.

According to the 2000 Census, Cathedral City had a total of 14,027 households, 39.3% of which had children under the age of 18 living with them, 50.7% of which were married couples living together, 11.9%  of which had a female householder with no husband present, and 31.4%  of which were non-families. Approximately 23% of all households were made up of individuals, with 11.0%  of them consisting of single individuals 65 years of age or older.  The average household size was 3.03 people and the average family size was roughly three and a half people (3.63), which puts Cathedral City above both the California and U.S. averages in those categories.

As reported in the most recent census, the city's population was distributed across all age groups, with 31.1% under the age of 18, 8.8% from 18 to 24, 30.6%  from 25 to 44, 17.3% from 45 to 64, and 12.2%  who were 65 years of age or older. The median age was 32 years. For every 100 females, there were 102.7 males.  For every 100 females age 18 and over, there were 102.0 males. Cathedral City has many senior citizen communities and mobile home parks.

The median income for a household in the city was $38,887, and the median income for a family was $42,461. Men had a median income of $29,598, and the median income for women was $25,289. The per capita income for the city was $16,215. About 10.2% of families and 13.6% of the total population had incomes below the poverty line, including 16.3% of those under age 18 and 7.9% of those age 65 or over (senior citizens).

Economy
Cathedral City has an automotive mega-dealership known as the Palm Springs Auto Mall based on the city limits with Palm Springs.

Cathedral City hosts an annual Mexican Independence Day festival on every third weekend of September. To commemorate the event, an "el Grito de Dolores" is held at the city hall/movie theater complex.

One of the world's most technologically advanced cannabis greenhouses is being developed in Cathedral City by the company Sunniva. Once completed, this facility will be approximately 489,000 square feet.

Parks and recreation
Date Palm Country Club and golf course, designed in 1967 and opened in 1971, has an 18-hole "executive style" facility designed by Ted Robinson, ASCCA. It features  of golf from the longest tees for a par of 58. The course rating is 54.9/57.2 and it has a slope rating of 90/93. It is landscaped in Bermuda Greens and includes lakes and sand traps. The most memorable tee is the 175 yard 8th hole, which has an accurate tee shot over a lake. The Phil Harris Golf Classic was held there for many years from the 1940s to Phil Harris' death in 1994. Though built on part of the Agua Caliente Indian Reservation, an exclusive retirement community of manufactured homes lines the greens.

The Big League Dreams Sports Park softball complex is on the corner of Date Palm and Dinah Shore drives, made up of four softball fields designed as replicas of four major league ballparks. The Pepsi All-Star Softball Game has been held there since 1998. The Cathedral City Soccer Park, next to James Workman Middle School, is where the So Cal Coyotes minor league football team play their games (and also in the Rancho Mirage High School stadium). In 2018–19, the So Cal Coyotes changed leagues and now play in Indio, California in the Shadow Hills High School football stadium.

The nine parks in Cathedral City are:

 Century Park
 Memorial Park
 Ocotillo Park
 Panorama Park
 Patriot Park
 Second Street Park
 Dennis Keat Soccer Park
 Town Square
 Dog Park

An additional park is proposed at Corta Road and Landau Boulevard.

Golf
Several local golf resorts are in Cathedral City. These include Lawrence Welk's Desert Oasis Hotel/resort located in the Cathedral Canyon Country Club, the Date Palm Country Club, Outdoor Resort – Palm Springs, Cimarron Golf Resort, and the Desert Princess Palm Springs Resort and Golf Club.

Government

County 
Cathedral City is in Supervisorial District 4 of Riverside County, represented by Democrat V. Manuel Perez.

State 

Federal 

Tribal Council 
The tribal council of the Agua Caliente Band of Cahuilla Indians governs over parts of the city where reservation jurisdictions overlap.

Education
Cathedral City High School, opened in 1991, is a major educational and recreational center to the city. The varsity football, basketball and soccer teams had earned CIF-southern California championship runs in the late 1990s and 2000s.
Cathedral City is also home to Mayfield College, a private college that offers career training in health care, HVAC, technology, and business.

Notable people

The city was a winter residence for actors Robert Duvall and Martin Landau in the 1960s,  and TV show host Monty Hall in the 1990s. Frank Sinatra's grave is located in Desert Memorial Park cemetery, as are those of several other prominent figures, including actor William Powell, singer-songwriter Sonny Bono, former mayor of Palm Springs, and actress Jane Wyman.

Other notable residents include:
Timothy Bradley (born 1983), a former WBO welterweight champion, is from Cathedral City and graduated from Cathedral City High School.
Lalo Guerrero (1916–2005), a Chicano folk musician, lived in Cathedral City in his final years.
John Michael Meehan (1959–2016), a nurse anesthetist and conman whose life story was adapted into the Dirty John podcast, lived in a trailer, on his sister Donna Meehan Stewart's RV lot in Cathedral City, before marrying Debra Newell.
Simon Oakland (1915–1983), an American actor, died in the town on August 29, 1983, a day after the actor's 68th birthday.
Agnes Lawrence Pelton (1881–1961), was a German-born modernist painter, who was particularly known for portraits of Native American Pueblo peoples, desert landscapes and still life paintings, spent the last 29 year of her life in Cathedral City. F Street was renamed Agnes Pelton Way in her honor.

See also 

 Cahuilla
 Coachella Valley
 Riverside County, California
 List of Riverside County, California, placename etymologies

References

Bibliography
Hillery, Robert A. (2015). Cathedral City The Early Years 1925 to 1981, Outskirts Press, Inc., Denver, Colorado.

Citations

Further reading

External links
 
 
 The Desert Sun at mydesert.com, Coachella Valley Newspaper
 

 
Cities in Riverside County, California
Coachella Valley
Incorporated cities and towns in California
Populated places in the Colorado Desert
Populated places established in 1925